This is a list of equipment used by the Mongolian Armed Forces.

The Ground Force possesses over 470 tanks, 650 infantry fighting vehicles and armoured personnel carriers, 500 mobile anti-aircraft weapons, more than 700 artillery and mortar and other military equipment. Most of them are old Soviet Union-made models designed between the late 1950s to early 1980s; there are a smaller number of newer models designed in post-Soviet Russia and China.

(Some Equipment may or may not be wrong due to the ministry of defence not releasing any numbers or quantities of vehicles)

Vehicles

Infantry weapons

Individual equipment

References 

Mongolia
Military of Mongolia
Equipment